Field Studies may refer to:
 Field Studies (album), a 1999 album by Quasi
 Field Studies (EP), a 2009 split EP by This Will Destroy You and Lymbyc Systym
 Field Studies Council, an educational charity based in the UK
 Field study or field research, information collected outside a laboratory or workplace setting